Radu Vodă Monastery is a Romanian Orthodox monastery in Bucharest, Romania.

History of the Place

Paleolithic
Because of its favorable environment and the elevated terrain close to a big river, the area of the monastery was inhabited starting from the Paleolithic (estimated somewhere between 1,000,000 and 10,000 BC). It is the site of the oldest known settlement on the territory of Romania. Following the Paleolithic settlement there was an uninterrupted settlement during the Neolithic with tools from the Neolithic, the Bronze Age (1800–800 BC), and the Iron Age (800 BC – AD 300).

The Dacian Era
The monastery is also the site of the remains of a fortified settlement from the Dacian Era (100 BC – AD 100).

History of the Monastery
The monastery was founded by Alexandru II Mircea (1568–1577) and his lady Ecaterina (Catherine) to give thanks for their victory in battle. It was intended to be the metropolitan church of the capital.  The monastery was completely renovated during 1969–1974, on the initiative of patriarch Justinian Marina.  Upon his death in 1977, the patriarch was laid to rest in a grave in the interior wall of the monastery.

Location
Located at Radu Vodă Street, no. 24A on the banks of Dâmbovița River and close to the Romanian Patriarchal Cathedral, the monastery is located right in the middle of Bucharest, the capital of Romania. It is a few hundred meters away from the exit of Piața Unirii metro station.

Gallery

External links
 Official Site
 More info in Romanian on another site
 Bucharest Historical Monuments Map

Monasteries in Bucharest
Romanian Orthodox churches in Bucharest
Historic monuments in Bucharest
Dacian fortresses in Romania